Atatürk's cult of personality was started during the life of Mustafa Kemal Atatürk and continued by his successors after his death in 1938, by members of both his Republican People's Party and opposition parties alike, and in a limited amount by himself during his lifetime in order to popularize and cement his social and political reforms as a founder and the first President of Turkey. Pro-PKK, British journalist, Alexander Christie-Miller, has described it as the "world's longest-running personality cult".

Overview
Following the defeat and partitioning of the Ottoman Empire by the Allies in the aftermath of World War I, Mustafa Kemal led the Turkish National Movement through a War of Independence against Greece, Armenia, France, Britain, and other invading countries. Under his leadership, the Republic of Turkey was declared in 1923, and he was honoured with the name Atatürk ("Father of the Turks") by the Grand National Assembly of Turkey in 1934.  His other titles include Great Leader (Ulu Önder),  Eternal Commander (Ebedî Başkomutan), Head Teacher (Başöğretmen), and Eternal Chief (Ebedî Şef).

Atatürk's memory remains a major part of Turkish politics and society into the 21st century. Almost every city in Turkey has streets named for him, and statues of him are commonly found in city squares, schools, and public offices, the latter two of which feature his portrait. The phrase Ne mutlu Türküm diyene (How happy is the one who says "I am a Turk"), which Atatürk used in his speech delivered for the 10th Anniversary of the Republic in 1933, is used widely in Turkey and is often seen along with his statues. It continues to be part of the compulsory Student Oath, though it was removed between 2013 and 2018. It was once again removed in 2021.

Atatürk's cult of personality is sometimes compared to those of authoritarian rulers of Central Asian countries, such as Nursultan Nazarbayev and Saparmurat Niyazov, but differs significantly in light of Atatürk's democratic and progressive reforms in Turkey and because most of the statues and memorials of him were erected after his death. For example, before the 1950s, only the incumbent President of Turkey's image appeared on Turkish currency, but Prime Minister Adnan Menderes (1950–1960), in a political blow to rival President İsmet İnönü, passed a law to restore the late Atatürk's image on the currency in order to deny İnönü's image appearing instead. Menderes's government, although opposed to Atatürk's Republican People's Party (which served as the opposition party in Parliament to Menderes's Democrat Party government), moved his body to a mausoleum 15 years after his death in 1953. It also passed a law in 1951 that criminalized insulting "Atatürk's memory."

The Economist wrote in 2012 that his personality cult "carpets the country with busts and portraits of the great man" and that this has been "nurtured by Turkey's generals, who have used his name to topple four governments, hang a prime minister and attack enemies of the republic." According to this British weekly, "hard-core Islamists despise Ataturk for abolishing the caliphate in 1924 and expunging piety from the public space. They feed rumours that he was a womaniser, a drunk, even a crypto-Jew."

A 2008 article in National Identities also discussed Atatürk's ubiquitous presence in the country:

Law on Atatürk
Turkish Law 5816 ("The Law Concerning Crimes Committed Against Atatürk") was passed 13 years after Atatürk's death on July 25, 1951, by Prime Minister Adnan Menderes's government, and protects "Atatürk's memory" from being offended by any Turkish citizen. 
In 2011, there were 48 convictions for "insulting Atatürk" and insulting Atatürk's memory is punishable by up to three years in jail. The law has been interpreted in a very broad way, covering not only the protection of Atatürk's memory, but also of his legacy. Charges have been brought in domestic proceedings against persons who challenge the official, very positive, assessment of the first years of the Republic of Turkey and Atatürk's role.

Statues
The first statue of Atatürk was sculpted in 1926 in the Sarayburnu district of Istanbul by Austrian sculptor Heinrich Krippel. Today, statues of Atatürk can be found all over Turkey.

See also
 Kemalism
 Atatürk's Reforms

References

Bibliography
Copeaux, Etienne, ″La transcendance d'Atatürk″, in Mayeur-Jaouen Catherine (ed.), Saints et héros du Moyen-Orient contemporain, Paris, Maisonneuve et Larose, 2002, pp. 121–138.

Mandel, Mike, and Zakari, Chantal, The State of Ata. The Contested Imagery of Power in Turkey, Eighteen Publications, Boston, 2010, 256-xvi p.

Cult of personality
Turkish culture
Politics of Turkey
Cults of personality
Kemalism
Mustafa Kemal Atatürk